Annette Lovemore is a South African politician for the Democratic Alliance (DA), and the mayoral committee member (MMC) of infrastructure and engineering in the Nelson Mandela Bay coalition government that took office in 2016. She previously served as a DA Member of Parliament between 2009 and 2016.

Early life
Annette Lovemore was born on 20 December 1958. She graduated from Kimberly Girls' High School in 1975 and went on to receive her BSc at University of Cape Town in 1978.

Political life
Lovemore served as a councillor in the Nelson Mandela Bay Municipality before being elected to Parliament in 2009. As the DA's Shadow Minister of Home Affairs, she has continuously brought to light the inadequacies of handling of the refugee applicants within South Africa, laws that could hurt the prospects of foreign investments into the country, and the Department of Home Affairs seemingly nonchalant handling of ID, grant and pension fraud happening from foreigners illegally in South Africa. She later served as Shadow Minister of Basic Education.

After the opposition victory in Nelson Mandela Bay in 2016, Lovemore left parliament to become a member of the mayoral committee, where she'll be focusing on Infrastructure and Engineering.

References 

Living people
Democratic Alliance (South Africa) politicians
Members of the National Assembly of South Africa
Women members of the National Assembly of South Africa
1958 births